The 1987 San Marino Grand Prix was a Formula One motor race held on 3 May 1987 at the Autodromo Dino Ferrari, Imola. It was the second race of the 1987 Formula One season. It was the seventh San Marino Grand Prix and it was held over 59 laps of the five kilometre circuit for a race distance of 297 kilometres.

The race was won by British driver Nigel Mansell driving a Williams FW11B. It was Mansell's eighth Grand Prix victory, his first (of two) at the Imola circuit. Mansell finished 27 seconds ahead of Brazilian driver Ayrton Senna driving a Lotus 99T. Third was Italian driver Michele Alboreto driving a Ferrari F1/87. The win gave Mansell a one-point lead in the championship over French McLaren driver Alain Prost.

Race summary
In Friday practice, championship contender Nelson Piquet was eliminated from the race after an accident at the Tamburello corner. A tyre of his Williams FW11B failed, which resulted in a violent impact against the wall (when the car was returned to the pits, Williams designer Patrick Head could not confirm if the crash was a fault with the FW11B as half the rear end had been torn off by the impact, while both Head and Nigel Mansell were seen talking a good look at Piquet's wreck). Whilst in his opinion he had only sustained a sore ankle, he was taken to the nearby Bellaria-Igea Marina hospital, and after medical checks he was forbidden to start by FIA Medical Delegate Sid Watkins. For the remainder of the weekend Piquet worked as a guest commentator on Italian television. Years later he revealed that he was "never quite right" after the accident, suffering headaches and sometimes double vision and for the rest of the 1987 season secretly visited the hospital for treatment. He did this in secret for fear that he would not be allowed to race either by Williams or Watkins.

Alarmed by reports from other drivers of excessive tyre blistering and the suggestion that Piquet's accident may have been caused by a tyre deflation, Goodyear withdrew all the tyres issued to teams (the original compounds taken to Imola were actually different to those supplied for a scheduled test at the circuit the week prior to the race). A replacement selection of the tyres used in the Imola test were flown in from England (with some also brought in from the nearby Ferrari factory in Maranello) and despite the lack of Customs officials due to an Italian public holiday, the new rubber was available for all teams by the Saturday morning practice session.

Saturday's qualifying went on smoothly, with Ayrton Senna claiming pole position on his Lotus 99T, the first ever pole position for an active suspension car and also the last pole position for the original Lotus team, with Mansell alongside him in the front row. The second row was occupied by Teo Fabi in the Benetton B187 and Alain Prost's McLaren MP4/3; "home" team Ferrari took the whole third row with Michele Alboreto ahead of Gerhard Berger.

The race required two starts as Martin Brundle (Zakspeed 871), Thierry Boutsen (Benetton B187) and Eddie Cheever (Arrows A10) stalled on the original grid. Satoru Nakajima started from the pit lane owing to a faulty battery in his Lotus, and René Arnoux failed to take the second start after the suspension of his Ligier JS29B failed.

At the second start, Senna led off the line, but Mansell overtook him on lap two, at the Tosa corner, and went on to dominate the race. Prost took second place by overtaking Senna on lap 6; the Brazilian was then engaged in a battle with the two Ferraris, and took back second when Prost surprisingly retired with an alternator failure on lap 15. Berger retired with turbo boost failure on lap 17, and by that time Alboreto passed Senna to take second place.

On lap 22, Mansell pitted early due to a loose wheel balance weight and for three laps Alboreto led the race to the delight of the Tifosi. Senna retook first position with Alboreto's pit stop, then before Mansell returned to the front when the Brazilian stopped. Riccardo Patrese in his Brabham BT56 was now holding second place but he retired when his alternator failed on lap 57. Simultaneously, Teo Fabi retired with engine problems. Fabi's race had been wrecked by front wing damage sustained on the first lap when he collided with Cheever, although his attempted fightback did produce the fastest lap.

Mansell took a comfortable win with Senna holding second after Alboreto's turbo experienced problems. Alboreto salvaged a 3rd place finish, which would end up being the last podium Enzo Ferrari personally saw his Formula One team score, as he only attended Grand Prix races in Italy, and would die 15 months later. Stefan Johansson (McLaren MP4/3) was in fourth place whilst Derek Warwick's late race retirement after his Arrows A10 ran out of fuel, handed fifth to Brundle for what would the only time in 5 seasons (1985-1989) that a Zakspeed would finish a race in the points. Nakajima rounded off the points in sixth place, which meant he was the first Japanese driver to score a world championship point.

Classification

Qualifying

Race 
Numbers in brackets refer to positions of normally aspirated entrants competing for the Jim Clark Trophy.

Championship standings after the race

Drivers' Championship standings

Constructors' Championship standings

Jim Clark Trophy standings

Colin Chapman Trophy standings

 Note: Only the top five positions are included for all four sets of standings.

References

San Marino Grand Prix
San Marino Grand Prix
San Marino Grand Prix